Citay is an American, San Francisco-based band currently released on Dead Oceans. The band was formed in 2004 by Ezra Feinberg as a studio project with Tim Green from The Fucking Champs, and some help from others. There is now a live band including members of Tussle, The Dry Spells, Sean Smith, 3 Leafs, and Daevid Allen's University of Errors. Citay performed at the South by Southwest Music Festival in 2007 and 2008.

Instrumentation 
The band uses acoustic and electric guitars, electric bass, keyboards, drums, and other percussions. The band's sound includes guitar harmonies, long instrumental sections, and Beach Boys-like vocals. The sound has been described as psychedelic pop-rock.

Discography 
Citay, 2006, Important Records (CD), Frenetic Records (LP)
Little Kingdom, 2007, Dead Oceans (CD), Important Records (LP)
Remixes, 2009, Dead Oceans
Dream Get Together (2010)

References

External links
 Citay MySpace
 SF Weekly review
 Seattle Stranger review
 Tiny Mix Tapes review
 LA Record interview with Ezra Feinberg

Musical groups from San Francisco
Psychedelic rock music groups from California
Dead Oceans artists